Sanaye Petrochimi Mahshahr is an Iranian professional basketball club based in Mahshahr, Iran. They compete in the Iranian Basketball Super League.

References

Basketball teams in Iran
Mahshahr County
Sport in Khuzestan Province